History of Political Thought is a quarterly peer-reviewed academic journal, which was established in 1980. It is dedicated to history, political philosophy, and political science. The journal is published by Imprint Academic (Exeter, England). It was co-founded by the historians Iain Hampsher-Monk and Janet Coleman, and has been ranked as an A* journal by the Australian Political Studies Association.

Abstracting and indexing
The journal is abstracted and indexed in:
Scopus
IBZ Online
Philosopher's Index
Arts & Humanities Citation Index
Worldwide Political Science Abstracts
Sociological Abstracts
Historical Abstracts
L'Année philologique
International Bibliography of the Social Sciences

External links

Political science journals
Publications established in 1980